The Lake Erie AVA is an American Viticultural Area that includes  of land on the south shore of Lake Erie in the U.S. states of Ohio, New York, and Pennsylvania.  Over  of the region are planted in grapevines, predominantly in the Concord grape variety.

Grapes were first cultivated in the area in the early 19th century, and many wineries survived Prohibition in the 20th century by legally selling grapes to home winemakers, marketing their products solely for religious purposes such as kosher wines (which continues to the present day), converting to grape juice production for local companies such as Welch's, or illegally selling wine to consumers in Canada.  The wine industry in the Lake Erie region did not thrive after the repeal of Prohibition, however, and by 1967 there were fewer than 20 commercial wineries in the area.  Recently, Lake Erie wineries have begun planting and vinifying Vitis vinifera varieties in an attempt to improve wine quality.

The region has a humid continental climate and is in hardiness zones 6a and 6b.

References

American Viticultural Areas
Ohio wine
New York (state) wine
Pennsylvania wine
1983 establishments in New York (state)
1983 establishments in Ohio
1983 establishments in Pennsylvania